The 2018–19 QMJHL season was the 50th season of the Quebec Major Junior Hockey League (QMJHL). The regular season began on September 20, 2018, and ended on March 16, 2019.

The playoffs started March 22, 2019 and ended on May 11. The winning team, the Rouyn-Noranda Huskies, were awarded the President's Cup as the QMJHL champion and earned a berth in the 2019 Memorial Cup, being hosted by the Halifax Mooseheads of the QMJHL at the Scotiabank Centre in Halifax, Nova Scotia from May 17–26, 2019.

Regular season standings

Note: GP = Games played; W = Wins; L = Losses; OTL = Overtime losses; SL = Shootout losses; GF = Goals for; GA = Goals against; PTS = Points; x = clinched playoff berth; y = clinched division title; z = clinched Jean Rougeau Trophy

Eastern Conference

Western Conference

Scoring leaders
Note: GP = Games played; G = Goals; A = Assists; Pts = Points; PIM = Penalty minutes

Leading goaltenders
Note: GP = Games played; Mins = Minutes played; W = Wins; L = Losses: OTL = Overtime losses; SL = Shootout losses; GA = Goals Allowed; SO = Shutouts; GAA = Goals against average

2019 President's Cup playoffs 
In the first two rounds seeding is determined by conference standings, and in the two final rounds seeding is determined by overall standings.

Conference quarter-finals

Western Conference quarter-finals

(1) Rouyn-Noranda Huskies vs. (8) Shawinigan Cataractes

(2) Drummondville Voltigeurs vs. (7) Gatineau Olympiques

(3) Sherbrooke Phoenix vs. (6) Blainville-Boisbriand Armada

(4) Victoriaville Tigres vs. (5) Val d'Or Foreurs

Eastern Conference quarter-finals

(1) Halifax Mooseheads vs. (8) Quebec Remparts

(2) Baie-Comeau Drakkar vs. (7) Moncton Wildcats

(3) Rimouski Océanic vs. (6) Chicoutimi Saguenéens

(4) Charlottetown Islanders vs. (5) Cape Breton Screaming Eagles

Conference semi-finals

Western Conference semi-finals

(1) Rouyn-Noranda Huskies vs. (4) Victoriaville Tigres

(2) Drummondville Voltigeurs vs. (3) Sherbrooke Phoenix

Eastern Conference semi-finals

(1) Halifax Mooseheads vs. (7) Moncton Wildcats

(3) Rimouski Océanic vs. (5) Cape Breton Screaming Eagles

Semi-finals

(1) Rouyn-Noranda Huskies vs. (5) Rimouski Océanic

(2) Drummondville Voltigeurs  vs. (3) Halifax Mooseheads

President's Cup Finals

(1) Rouyn-Noranda Huskies vs. (3) Halifax Mooseheads

Playoff leading scorers
Note: GP = Games played; G = Goals; A = Assists; Pts = Points; PIM = Penalties minutes

Playoff leading goaltenders

Note: GP = Games played; Mins = Minutes played; W = Wins; L = Losses: OTL = Overtime losses; SL = Shootout losses; GA = Goals Allowed; SO = Shutouts; GAA = Goals against average

Trophies and awards
President's Cup – Playoff Champions: Rouyn-Noranda Huskies
Jean Rougeau Trophy – Regular Season Champions: Rouyn-Noranda Huskies
Luc Robitaille Trophy – Team with the best goals for average: Drummondville Voltigeurs
Robert Lebel Trophy – Team with best GAA: Rouyn-Noranda Huskies

Player
Michel Brière Memorial Trophy – Most Valuable Player: Alexis Lafrenière, Rimouski Océanic
Jean Béliveau Trophy – Top Scorer: Peter Abbandonato, Rouyn-Noranda Huskies
Guy Lafleur Trophy – Playoff MVP: Noah Dobson, Rouyn-Noranda Huskies
Jacques Plante Memorial Trophy – Top Goaltender: Samuel Harvey, Rouyn-Noranda Huskies
Guy Carbonneau Trophy – Best Defensive Forward: Félix Lauzon, Drummondville Voltigeurs
Emile Bouchard Trophy – Defenceman of the Year: Charles-Édouard D'Astous, Rimouski Océanic
Kevin Lowe Trophy – Best Defensive Defenceman: Jacob Neveu, Rouyn-Noranda Huskies
Michael Bossy Trophy – Top Prospect: Raphaël Lavoie, Halifax Mooseheads
RDS Cup – Rookie of the Year: Jordan Spence, Moncton Wildcats
Michel Bergeron Trophy – Offensive Rookie of the Year: Hendrix Lapierre, Chicoutimi Saguenéens
Raymond Lagacé Trophy – Defensive Rookie of the Year: Jordan Spence, Moncton Wildcats
Frank J. Selke Memorial Trophy – Most sportsmanlike player: Peter Abbandonato, Rouyn-Noranda Huskies
QMJHL Humanitarian of the Year – Humanitarian of the Year: Charle-Édouard D'Astous, Rimouski Océanic
Marcel Robert Trophy – Best Scholastic Player: Matthew Welsh, Charlottetown Islanders
Paul Dumont Trophy – Personality of the Year: Alexis Lafrenière, Rimouski Océanic

Executive
Ron Lapointe Trophy – Coach of the Year: Mario Pouliot, Rouyn-Noranda Huskies
Maurice Filion Trophy – General Manager of the Year: Mario Pouliot, Rouyn-Noranda Huskies

All-Star Teams 
First All-Star Team:
 Samuel Harvey, Goaltender, Rouyn-Noranda Huskies
 Charles-Édouard D'Astous, Defenceman, Rimouski Océanic
 Noah Dobson, Defenceman, Rouyn-Noranda Huskies
 Alexis Lafrenière, Forward, Rimouski Océanic
 Joe Veleno, Forward, Drummondville Voltigeurs
 Peter Abbandonato, Forward, Rouyn-Noranda Huskies

Second All-Star Team:
 Tristan Côté-Cazenave, Goaltender, Victoriaville Tigres
 Nicolas Beaudin, Defenceman, Drummondville Voltigeurs
 Jared McIsaac, Defenceman, Halifax Mooseheads
 Ivan Chekhovich, Forward, Baie-Comeau Drakkar
 Samuel Asselin, Forward, Halifax Mooseheads
 Jimmy Huntington, Forward, Rimouski Océanic

All-Rookie Team:
 Fabio Iacobo, Goaltender, Victoriaville Tigres
 Jordan Spence, Defenceman, Moncton Wildcats
 Lukas Cormier, Defenceman, Charlottetown Islanders
 Hendrix Lapierre, Forward, Chicoutimi Saguenéens
 Egor Serdyuk, Forward, Victoriaville Tigres
 Mikhail Abramov, Forward, Victoriaville Tigres

See also
 List of QMJHL seasons
 2018 in ice hockey
 2019 in ice hockey
 2018–19 OHL season
 2018–19 WHL season
 2019 Memorial Cup

References

External links
 Official QMJHL website
 Official CHL website
 Official website of the Subway Super Series

Quebec Major Junior Hockey League seasons
Qmjhl